Wax and Wane (Traditional Chinese: 團圓) is a 2011 Hong Kong television drama produced by Television Broadcasts Limited (TVB), with Nelson Cheung serving as the executive producer. The drama follows the story of two rival families, dealing with themes of revenge, greed, business affairs, and family.

Plot
Yung Shing-fun (Lau Siu-ming) and his cousin Man Wing-cheong (Chow Chung) have been at odds for years, over the trade name rights of their family's noodle shop.

Eugene (Roger Kwok), Fun's eldest son engages in a property development project in order to solve the problem. Unwillingly, he offers to buy out the location of Cheong's noodle shop with his company's shares. He also invites Cheong and his son, Fung (Sunny Chan), to join the company's management.

Eugene actually has ulterior motives for doing this, as he hates Fung to the core for marrying his girlfriend Ko Wai-ting (Florence Kwok). On top of this, Eugene's younger brother, Gary (Ron Ng), is going out with Cheong's second daughter, Peace (Kate Tsui), regardless of his family's opposition.

Now, Eugene is at his wits' end as he has to handle his family issues single-handedly. He never understood what family ties really meant, nor had he the courage to try to find it out, until now.

Production
Pre-production and character casting began September 2009. Roger Kwok and Derek Kok were cast first; upon hearing this, Ron Ng explained that he turned down two mainland Chinese drama offers in order to fit his schedule to film Wax and Wane with Kwok. Myolie Wu was also reported to have been part of the project, but later dropped out due to scheduling conflicts.

A costume fitting and press conference for the drama was held on 12 January 2010, and filming began the following week. A blessing ceremony was held on 9 March 2010. Filming ended 22 April 2010, taking a full four months to complete.

Cast and characters

Yung family
Yung Shing-fun (portrayed by Lau Siu-ming): The patriarch of the Yung family. He is the younger maternal cousin and rival of Man Wing-cheong.
Kwong Lai-ying (portrayed by Mannor Chan): Fun's wife.(Deceased)
Wong Sau-ping (portrayed by Claire Yiu): Fun's mistress.
Eugene Yung Yi-Chun (portrayed by Roger Kwok): Fun and Ying's eldest son.
Maggie Yung Yi-lam (portrayed by Irene Wong): Fun and Ying's daughter.
Gary Yung Yi-hang (portrayed by Ron Ng): Fun and Ying's youngest son who is dating Peace, Cheong's daughter. Now married to her.

Man family
Man Fa-tung (portrayed by Lily Leung): Fun's maternal aunt and Cheong's paternal aunt.
Man Wing-cheong (portrayed by Chow Chung): The older maternal cousin and rival of Fun.
Man Kar-fung, nicknamed Funky (portrayed by Sunny Chan): Cheong's eldest son.
Ko Wai-ting (portrayed by Florence Kwok): Fung's wife and Eugene's ex-girlfriend.
Peace Man Ka-fu, nicknamed Fully (portrayed by Kate Tsui): Cheong's youngest daughter and Fung's younger sister who has been dating Gary, Fun's youngest son. Now married to him.
Ho Kar-moon, nicknamed Moonie (portrayed by Toby Leung): Cheong's niece and Fun's daughter.
Roy Lai Pak-hei (portrayed by Him Law): A lawyer and Cheong's godson.

Other characters
Wong Hung (portrayed by Derek Kok): Ping's older brother a.k.a. Ping's husband
Chan Yat-chung (portrayed by Benz Hui): Fun's personal assistant.
Chan Chik-man (portrayed by Oscar Leung): Chung's son.
Lee Kiu (portrayed by Ha Ping): Ying's mother and Fun's mother-in-law.
Zita Wah Hoi_lai (portrayed by Becky Lee): Daughter of a land developer tycoon.

Awards and nominations

45th TVB Anniversary Awards 2011
 Nominated: Best Drama
 Nominated: Best Actor (Roger Kwok)
 Nominated: Best Actor (Ron Ng)
 Nominated: Best Supporting Actress (Mannor Chan)
 Nominated: Best Supporting Actress (Florence Kwok)
 Nominated: My Favourite Female Character (Toby Leung)

Viewership ratings

References

External links
 TVB.com - Official Website 
K for TVB English Synopsis 
List of Wax and Wane episodes

TVB dramas
2011 Hong Kong television series debuts
2011 Hong Kong television series endings